is a Japanese josei and shōjo manga magazine published bimonthly by Shueisha. As of 2008, the circulation was about 175,000, which by 2015 had dropped to 56,000.

History 
Cookie is a sister magazine of Ribon. Ribon Deluxe, a quarterly magazine and another sister magazine of Ribon, had changed its title to Bouquet (ぶ〜け) in 1978. Bouquet stopped publication in March 2000.

In 1996, the Ribon editing department at Shueisha began publishing a manga magazine called Ribon Teens which featured various Ribon mangaka both up-and-coming at the time and already popular, such as Ai Yazawa, Miho Obana and Mihona Fujii, as well as classic Ribon manga artists, such as Jun Hasegawa, Koi Ikeno and Aoi Hiiragi. This magazine folded in 1997. In 1999, Shueisha revived the Ribon Teens concept as a new magazine called Cookie.

The former Bouquet editing department became the Cookie editing department. The editor-in-chief had previously been the editor-in-chief of Ribon. Cookie began being published monthly starting from the May 2000 issue, and switched to being published bimonthly in July 2012. 

The mangaka featured in Cookie were a mixture of former Bouquet artists (some series that ran in Bouquet, such as Toriko Chiya's Clover and Yumi Ikefuji's Zoccha no Nichijou, were transferred to Cookie) and former Ribon mangaka such as Miho Obana and Ai Yazawa. There were some up-and-coming mangaka as well. Manga artist Mari Okazaki described that the magazine at its beginning felt stylish and fresh, as the two separate schools of Bouquet and Ribon merged in the magazine. She felt like she had a high degree of artistic freedom in the magazine.

The most commercially successful manga published in Cookie is Ai Yazawa's Nana. It was one of the first manga to run in Cookie. Its book publications sold more than 50 million times and it has been adapted into an anime as well as two live-action films.

Serializations

Current
Good Morning Kiss (2007–Present) by Yue Takasuka
Koshoku Robot (2014–Present) by Hisae Iwaoka (moved from Jump X)

Hiatus
Nana (2000–2009) by Ai Yazawa

Finished
Clover (2000–2006) by Toriko Chiya
Tokimeki Midnight (2002–2009) by Koi Ikeno
Shibuya ku Maruyama cho (2003–2004, 2007–2009) by Mari Okazaki
Honey Bitter (2004–2018) by Miho Obana
Kiyoku Yawaku (2004–2010) by Ryo Ikuemi
Cheer Boys!! (2011–2013) by Ayaka Matsumoto and Ryō Asai
Papa no Iukoto o Kikinasai ~Miu-sama no Iu Tōri!~ (2011–2012) by Tomoo Katou and Tomohiro Matsu
Akazukin Chacha N (2012–2019) by Min Ayahana
Mr. Osomatsu (2018–2020) by Masako Shitara

See also

 Ribon

References

External links
 The official Cookie website 
 

Manga magazines published in Japan
Josei manga magazines
Shōjo manga magazines
Magazines established in 1999
Shueisha magazines
1999 establishments in Japan